Elysius thrailkilli is a moth of the family Erebidae. It was described by William Schaus in 1892. It is found in Mexico.

References

thrailkilli
Moths described in 1892
Moths of Central America